The Interns presented by Allied Insurance, is a reality TV show designed to seek potential talent and skill for the marketing and advertising industry. In each episode teams will be assigned projects related to marketing, including social media & cause marketing. Each team consists of 5 students from each institute. The winning team will be rewarded with a guaranteed job from Allied Insurance & sponsors along with other prizes. During the show other companies can also express interest for specific interns (including those eliminated) and these will be updated in every show.

Format

Candidate Selection

Candidates are chosen by their respected institutions. Each institution have to select 5 member team to represent their institution.

Tasks

Two competing teams will get the same task to do but in different location. Locations are selected by a lucky draw in the briefing. After the briefing teams go to planning stage where they are given certain amount of time to prepare their business and marketing plan and present that to their team mates. The following day and in some cases same day teams will be heading into the field to complete their task according to the plan which they have created.

Boardroom

After completion of the task, the teams report back to the "boardroom". Where they will be judged on how they have performed their task and its relevance to the business plan which teams have created. At the end of the boardroom one team will get eliminated and the winner will progress to the next round.

Grand Finale

Grand Finale will be held at Dharubaaruge and will be aired live on Television Maldives. Before the "Grand Finale" two finalists will play a bonus round in which elimination will not happen.

Schedule

Unlike most reality television programmes, the whole of The Interns Show is pre-recorded. Show will be aired on national television Television Maldives on every Thursday night 22:00-23:00 (GMT +5).

Participants

Clique College
Mohamed Rashid, Ahmed Reehan, Shifaz Ahmed, Fathimath Abdulla and Aishath Nuha

Cyryx College
Aminath Nafa, Ibrahim Shimau, Hussian Hamdhaan Abdullah, Ali Fahmy and Ali Shaheem

CHSE
Ali Aslam, Mariyam Hana, Ahmed Nashiu Naeem, Mohamed Sameer and Jayyidha Badhury

Faculty of Hospitality and Tourism Studies
Shaina Ahmed, Ali Ashham, Aminath Inaya, Aminath Sithura and Imthinan A. Ghafoor

Faculty of Management and Computing
Ahmed Izzath Abdullah, Fathmath Hanaan Ahmed, Ahmed Shafiu, Ahmed Farish and Aishath Asifa

MAPS College 
Shafiya Ismail, Jazlaan Shareef, Nivaan Ahmed, Mariyam Nashfa and Ibrahim Shiyam

Male' Business School
Ahmed Fuad (MBS Student), Aanisa Hassan, Jumana Niyaz, Guraisha Moosa and Mohamed Mausoom

Villa College
Mohamed Amjad, Fathman Shinana, Mohamed Zeehan, Ismail Shah Adam and Bushra A. Wahhab

Transmissions

Original series

Similar programs
 The Apprentice (UK TV series), with Lord Alan Sugar
 The Apprentice Australia, with Mark Bouris
 The Benefactor, with Mark Cuban of the NBA Dallas Mavericks
 The Rebel Billionaire, with Richard Branson of the Virgin Group
 The Law Firm with Roy Black
 Fire Me... Please/The Sack Race, where contestants try to get fired from their job
 My Big Fat Obnoxious Boss, a parody and hoax
 Win In China
 The Apprentice (Irish TV series), with Bill Cullen
 The Apprentice New Zealand
 Diili, with Hjallis Harkimo
 The CfC-Stanbic Bank Magnate, also known as The Magnate, Kenyan Business Reality Show

References

Allied Insurance Company
Clique College
Think Associates
IMDB

Maldives